Talışlar is a village in the Agdam District of Azerbaijan.

References 

Populated places in Aghdam District